Józef Rożański (28 November 1931 – 16 March 2022) was a Polish politician. A member of the Alliance of Democrats, he served in the Sejm from 1976 to 1985. He died in Nowy Targ on 16 March 2022, at the age of 90.

References

1931 births
2022 deaths
Alliance of Democrats (Poland) politicians
Members of the Polish Sejm 1976–1980
Members of the Polish Sejm 1980–1985
People from Nowy Targ